Lake Lillian is the name of several places in the United States:

Lakes
 Lake Lillian (Florida), in Highlands County
 Lake Lillian (Kandiyohi County, Minnesota)
 Lake Lillian (Washington), in the Alpine Lakes Wilderness

Cities and townships
 Lake Lillian, Minnesota, a small city in Kandiyohi County
 Lake Lillian Township, Kandiyohi County, Minnesota